John 1:13 is the thirteenth verse in the first chapter of the Gospel of John in the New Testament of the Christian Bible.

Content
In the original Greek according to Westcott-Hort, this verse is:
οἳ οὐκ ἐξ αἱμάτων, οὐδὲ ἐκ θελήματος σαρκός, οὐδὲ ἐκ θελήματος ἀνδρός, ἀλλ᾿ ἐκ Θεοῦ ἐγεννήθησαν.  

In the King James Version of the Bible the text reads:
Which were born, not of blood, nor of the will of the flesh, nor of the will of man, but of God.

The New International Version translates the passage as:
children born not of natural descent, nor of human decision or a husband's will, but born of God.

Analysis
According to Lapide, "John here gives an antithesis between human generation and Divine, and demonstrates the superiority of the latter. For he says that the former is of bloods (αἱμάτων), which is a Hebraism for blood, meaning the blood of man, produced by food." In terms of the phrase "of God", Lapide says it refers to the Spirit and grace of God, "by which the mind of man, beforetime carnal, is regenerated and justified, and so a man becomes spiritual, just, and holy, a friend, yea, a son of God."

Commentary from the Church Fathers
Augustine: "To be made then the sons of God, and brothers of Christ, they must of course be born; for if they are not born, how can they be sons? Now the sons of men are born of flesh and blood, and the will of man, and the embrace of wedlock; but how these are born, the next words declare: Not of bloods; that is, the male’s and the female’s. Bloods is not correct Latin, but as it is plural in the Greek, the translator preferred to put it so, though it be not strictly grammatical, at the same time explaining the word in order not to offend the weakness of one’s hearers."

Bede: "It should be understood that in holy Scripture, blood in the plural number, has the signification of sin: thus in the Psalms Deliver me from blood-guiltiness. (Ps. 51:14)."

Augustine: "In that which follows, Nor of the will of the flesh, nor of the will of man, the flesh is put for the female; because, when she was made out of the rib, Adam said, This is now bone of my bone and flesh of my flesh. (Gen. 2:23) The flesh therefore is put for the wife, as the spirit sometimes is for the husband; because that the one ought to govern, the other to obey. For what is there worse than an house, where the woman hath rule over the man? But these that we speak of are born neither of the will of the flesh, nor the will of man, but of God."

Bede: " The carnal birth of men derives its origin from the embrace of wedlock, but the spiritual is dispensed by the grace of the Holy Spirit."

Chrysostom: "The Evangelist makes this declaration, that being taught the vileness and inferiority of our former birth, which is through blood, and the will of the flesh, and understanding the loftiness and nobleness of the second, which is through grace, we might hence receive great knowledge, worthy of being bestowed by him who begat us, and after this show forth much zeal."

References

External links
Other translations of John 1:13 at BibleHub

01:13